Riverside Girls High School is a secondary, public, day school for girls, located in Huntleys Point, New South Wales, a suburb of Sydney, Australia. It was founded in 1934, celebrating its 80th Anniversary in 2014.

Riverside is divided into two groupings. The Junior section consists of the 7th to the 10th grades. The Senior section consists of 11th and 12th grade classes.

Riverside Girls High School has remarkable waterfront views. The school's motto is "Facta Non Verba" meaning 'Deeds Not Words'.

Extra-curricular activities 

Other extracurricular activities include:
 Students Representative Council
 Drama Soiree
 Sports
 Concert Band – the concert band is entered into competitions every year, such as Macdonalds festival
 Stage (jazz) Band
 Choir
 Peer Mediation dispute settlement Program, and the NSW Law Society Peer Mediation SCRAM Competition
 Peer Support Program with Year 7 and 10
 Mock Trial
 Amnesty International group 
 Public Speaking Club
 Dance Company and Ensemble
 Lite (Religious meet)
 SIFE (Students in Free Enterprise) Business Competition
 Drama Club and Environment Club

Notable alumni
Muriel Lylie Porter OAM (née Carter) – Journalist and author; Anglican laywoman
Connie Mitchell – Australian pop singer, member of Sneaky Sound System
Casey Burgess – Member of popular children's performance group- Hi 5
Karen Moras - Olympic swimmer, Bronze Medallist, Mexico
Gia Carides - Actress
 Leeanna Walsman - Actress, looking for Alibrandi, Wentworth

See also
List of Government schools in New South Wales

References

External links

Public high schools in Sydney
Girls' schools in New South Wales
Educational institutions established in 1934
1934 establishments in Australia